Ellen Cantor (1961–2013) was an American artist. Cantor was known for combining pornography, politics, pop culture and the handmade in her paintings, drawings, sculptures, videos, and films. Born in Detroit, Michigan to a Jewish family, Cantor completed her studies at Brandeis University in 1983 with a degree in painting. She went on to study at the Skowhegan School of Painting and Sculpture in 1991.

Solo exhibitions and screenings 
Be My Baby, Delfina, London, 1999; XL Xavier LaBoulbenne, New York, 1998 and 1996; Feigen, Chicago, 1997; Cabinet, London, 1996; and Postmasters, New York, 1995.
Video Drawing 1996-2001, Transmission Gallery, Glasgow, 2000; Kunstbunker, Nuremberg, 2001.
Ellen Cantor Cerith Wyn Evans, Kunsthalle Wien, 2002; Sketch, London, 2005; Prince Charles Cinema, London, 2005.
Path of Sun – Road of Life, 1000000 mph, London, 2006
Within a Budding Grove, Participant Inc, New York, 2008; White Cubicle, London, 2008; Abbt Projects, Zurich, 2007
Subversive Cinema: Ellen Cantor, curated by Lux, Zoo art fair, London, 2009
Serpentine Cinema: Film in Progress, Serpentine Gallery, curated by Nicola Lees/Victoria Brooks, London, 2009
Séance de projection de films, La GAD, Gallerie Arnaud Deschin, Marseille, 2011
The Dictator & the Maid, The Black Mariah, Cork, Ireland, curated by Dallas Seitz & The Black Mariah, 2014
Ellen Cantor at Künstlerhaus Stuttgart and Cinderella Syndrome at Wattis Institute for Contemporary Arts, San Francisco curated by Jamie Stevens and Fatima Hellberg, 2015–16

Death and legacy 
Cantor died on April 22, 2013 in her apartment in New York City after a year-long battle with lung cancer.

References

External links 
Cinderella Syndrome
Detroit Interview, June 9, 2008

Artists from Detroit
Feminist artists
Jewish American artists
1961 births
2013 deaths
20th-century American women artists
21st-century American women artists
Brandeis University alumni
Jewish women artists
Skowhegan School of Painting and Sculpture alumni